The Michigan Stars were a professional hockey team based in Kalkaska, Michigan. The team was a part of the Midwest Hockey League and folded before the season started.

External links
Official MWHL website

Kalkaska County, Michigan
2008 establishments in Michigan
Ice hockey clubs established in 2008